"Keep Your Body Working" is a single released in 2008 recorded by Tony Moran featuring Martha Wash. It is the second number one single on the Billboard Hot Dance Club Play chart from Moran's 2-disc CD collection The Event, following "Walk Away." The CD promo-only single reached the top spot on December 22, 2007, and stayed there for two weeks.

The track itself is actually a "reworking" of a Disco classic by the group Kleeer, except it was originally titled "Keeep Your Body Workin'," which was written by Kleeer group member Norman Durham. The original peaked at number 54 on the Club Play chart in 1979. Although both versions featured the same chorus and elements, the Moran/Wash version had lyrics that were different from the original version.

Charts

Weekly charts

Year-end charts

References

2007 singles
Martha Wash songs
House music songs
Techno songs
2007 songs